Thoddoo (Dhivehi: ތޮއްޑޫ) is one of the inhabited islands of Alif Alif Atoll in the Republic of Maldives.

History

Archaeology

There are Buddhist ruins in an area of this island and some key remains were found.
The Buddhist remains show that at some point in history the people were following Buddhism. However, with the spread of Islam in the country, the people embraced the Monotheistic religion whole heartedly as is evidenced by the continued adherence to the teachings of Islam, despite the geographical isolation of the island.
In recent years there have been attempts by Hindutva to promote fabricated narrations of proto Hinduism history in the Maldives. However there has been no evidence of this.

Geography
One-third of the total area is agricultural, another third is the village itself, and the rest of the island is empty.

Demography

Economy

Agriculture is the one of the main income sources of the island. Local farmers cultivate various tropical vegetables like chillies, brinjal, bottle gourd, bitter gourd, drumstick, ladies finger, pumpkin and different types of fruits like papaya, honey melons, passion fruit, banana, water apple and mango. This island is the largest producer of watermelon in Maldives. Watermelons are commonly produced during the holy month of Ramadan when demand in Malé peaks and prices are high. Thoddoo is well known as the largest producer of betel leaf in the country and it is the strongest economic activity in Thoddoo in the past 40 years.

When the local tourism was introduced in the year 2015, Thoddoo alsostarted playing a wide role in tourism industry and the tourism is now becoming a main economy of Thoddoo. Now, there are approximately over 200  guest rooms and 10 restaurants on the island. 15 speed boats for guest transfer are available and its total annual turn over comes approximately $ 5.4 million.

References

Xavier Romero-Frias, The Maldive Islanders, A Study of the Popular Culture of an Ancient Ocean Kingdom. Barcelona 1999, 
Divehi Tārīkhah Au Alikameh. Chapter 11, page 262.

Islands of the Maldives